Law schools in this list are categorized by whether they are currently active, proposed, or closed; within each section they are listed in alphabetical order by state, then name. Most of these law schools grant the Juris Doctor degree, which is the typical first professional degree in law in the United States.

Law schools are nationally accredited by the American Bar Association (ABA), and graduates of these schools may generally sit for the bar exam in any state. There are 199 ABA accredited law schools, along with one law school provisionally accredited by the ABA. Whittier Law School, Arizona Summit Law School and Concordia University School of Law are the most recent law school closures. The latter two having discontinued their legal programs in 2019, while the former closed in the summer of 2020.

The ABA revoked the accreditation of Thomas Jefferson School of Law in 2019.

In addition, individual state legislatures or bar examiners, like the State Bar of California, may maintain a separate accreditation system which is open to non-ABA accredited schools.  The California State Bar also accredits law schools, which the California Committee of Bar Examiners (CBE) recognizes.  Also, the CBE allows registered "Unaccredited" schools to operate and students of those schools are eligible to take the California Bar Examination upon graduation.

No correspondence or online law schools are accredited by the ABA or by state bar examiners. However, twelve correspondence and online law schools, although not accredited, are registered by the Committee of Bar Examiners of the State Bar of California. This means that the graduates of these distance learning law schools can sit for the California Bar Examination and, under varying circumstances, the bar exams in many other states.

Non-profit schools

1 – Provisional ABA accreditation expired in June 2011 
2 – Provisional accreditation via the Puerto Rico Supreme Court

For-profit schools

Proposed

Former

See also
 History of the American legal profession
Lists of law schools
Law school in the United States
Legal education in the United States
Law school rankings in the United States
Online law school
List of law school GPA curves
List of law schools attended by United States Supreme Court justices
Catholic University of America School of Canon Law

Notes

External links
List of ABA approved law schools
Law Schools, State Bar of California
NALP (National Association for Law Placement) Directory of Law Schools—a non-profit educational association listing of law schools
List of Top Law Schools – U.S. News University Directory

 
United States
Law